Kevin Howard Scott Sessums (born March 28, 1956) is an American author, editor and actor.

Early life
Kevin Sessums was born on March 28, 1956, in Forest, Mississippi. His brother is artist Dr. J. Kim Sessums of Brookhaven, Mississippi.

Sessums attended, but dropped out of, the Juilliard School in New York City.

Career
Sessums has served as executive editor of Interview and as a contributing editor of Vanity Fair, Allure, and Parade.  His work has also appeared in Travel+Leisure, Elle, Out, Marie Claire, Playboy, Thedailybeast.com and Towleroad.com. He was the founding Editor-in-Chief of FourTwoNine magazine and the Editor at Large of the Curran Theatre in San Francisco. Currently, he is the Editor in Chief of sessumsMagazine.com which he founded in October 2017 as well as Editor at Large at Grazia USA.

In 2007, Sessums published a memoir titled Mississippi Sissy, which is about the conflicted life of a self-aware gay boy growing up in Forest, Mississippi. It made the New York Times Bestseller list and won the 2008 Lambda Literary Award for Best Male Memoir.  His audio recording of Mississippi Sissy was nominated for a 2007 Quill Award.  In 2015, he published his second memoir, I Left It on the Mountain, which made the New York Times Celebrity Bestseller List.

Sessums portrayed the character Peter Cipriani in the miniseries adaptation of Armistead Maupin's Tales of the City.

Sessums was banned from posting on Facebook for 24 hours on December 29, 2016, after he compared the supporters of President-elect Donald Trump to a "nasty fascistic lot" in a post. The company subsequently issued an apology.

Personal life
Sessums is openly gay and he is HIV+. In an August 2014 interview with The New York Times to promote FourTwoNine, a magazine, he claimed to have used crystal meth. At the time of the interview, he resided in San Francisco, but now lives in partially abroad.

Works

References

External links
 Web site for Mississippi Sissy

1956 births
American memoirists
American gay writers
LGBT people from Mississippi
Living people
Lambda Literary Award winners
People with HIV/AIDS
Juilliard School alumni
People from Forest, Mississippi
Gay memoirists